{{ infobox company
| name             = Minoan Lines
| logo             = 
| caption          = 
| type             = 
| traded_as        =
| fate             = 
| predecessor      = 
| successor        = 
| foundation       = 1972
| defunct          =
| location_city    = 
| location_country = 
| location         = Heraklion, Greece
| locations        = 
| area_served      =Aegean Sea
| key_people       = Emanuele Grimaldi (Chairman)Loukas Sigalas (CEO)| industry         =ShippingTransport
| products         = 
| services         = Passenger transportationFreight transportation
| revenue          =€57.45 million (2020)
| operating_income =€(14.60) million (2020)
| net_income       =€(15.39) million (2020)
| aum              = 
| assets           =€280.62 million (2020)
| equity           =€255.17 million (2020)
| owner            =Grimaldi Group (95.9%)
| num_employees    =415 (2020)
| parent           = 
| homepage         = www.minoan.gr
| footnotes        = 
| intl             = 
}}Minoan Lines is one of the largest passenger ferry companies in Europe, and one of the dominant passenger ferry companies in Greece, sailing between Piraeus and Crete and in the Adriatic Sea, between Patras and various Italian ports. The company was founded in May 1972. Since 2008 Grimaldi's Compagnia di Navigazione SpA owns and controls 95.9 of the stock of Minoan Lines.

Its logo is derived from The Lily Prince fresco of Knossos.

History2003The cooperation between Minoan and Grimaldi ended, with only the MS Oceanus deployed on the Italy-Tunisia route.
The MS Oceanus was renamed Ariadne Palace I and sold to Corsica Ferries.
MS Prometheus was sold to Caronte shipping, an Italian shipping company.2004Minoan decided to focus solely on the shipping sector and sold its stake in Aegean Airlines.2005Attica Group acquired 10.23% of the share capital of Minoan, reaching an 11.61% stake in the company.
Minoan sold its 18% stake in Forthnet to Intracom.2006The MS Ariadne Palace was sold to Moby Lines. All three vessels from the Samsung shipyard were sold to other companies.
Minoan Lines was Passenger Line of the Year according to Lloyd's List.2007In February, Attica Group increased its stake in Minoan Lines.
In June, Attica Group sold its entire stake in Minoan (22.2%) to Access Maritime SA, which is controlled by Mr. Laskarides.
In December, Sea Star Capital, owner of ANEK Lines, acquired a 26.05% stake in Minoan Lines from Access Maritime in a privately negotiated transaction.2008In January, Sea Star Capital signed an agreement with Grimaldi's Compagnia di Navigazione SpA to sell its 26.7 percent stake in Minoan.
In October, Compagnia di Navigazione SpA, parent company of the Grimaldi Group, raised its stake above the limit of one third of shared capital and voting rights, which triggered a mandatory bid for the rest of the shares. The offer was launched at the end of October and lasted until the end of November. During this period, Grimaldi acquired an additional 47.9% stake in Minoan Lines, raising its total stake to about 85%.2009-10In January, MS Pasiphae Palace was sold to SNCM, and became the Jean Nicoli. The replacement on the Venice - Igoumenitsa - Patras route was the MS Eurostar Barcelona, on loan from the parent company Grimaldi, formerly operated by Minoan under the name of MS  Prometheus. Eurostar Barcelona was renamed Zeus Palace. 
Ikarus Palace began operating on charter with Grimaldi Group on the Livorno - Barcelona - Tangier route. 
In October 2009, the new MS Cruise Europa was delivered, followed by the sister-ship MS Cruise Olympia in the early summer 2010.2011In January 2011 Minoan Lines cancelled the sale of its 33.35% stake in Hellenic Seaways to ANEK and tried to find a new buyer for it.2012The year began with a significant loss for the company - the closure of the Venice route. The fate of the ships that operated on this line remained uncertain until the end of July 2012, when Europa Palace joined Cruise Europa and Cruise Olympia on the Ancona route. Meanwhile, Olympia Palace was laid up in Perama. Despite the rumored reopening of the Piraeus - Chania route, both ships were then chartered to CIN, owner of the recently privatized Tirrenia di Navigazione, and used on the Cagliari - Arbatax - Civitavecchia route. Europe Palace was renamed Amsicora, and "Olympia Palace" became Bonaria. Both ships underwent a partial refit at Messina, and changed their ports of registry from Heraklion to Cagliari, and their flags from Greek to Italian.
At the end of 2012 the daily Ancona - Igoumenitsa - Patras route was extended to call at Trieste thrice weekly. The route was operated by Cruise Europa and Cruise Olympia. A third ship, Europalink, was also added to the route in order to increase load capacity. The ship was previously operated by another Grimaldi Group company, Finnlines, but was changed flags from Swedish to Italian and operated in cooperation with Grimaldi.2013On January 5, Europalink experience a failure and was forced to make an emergency stop in the port of Brindisi. Passengers and vehicles were disembarked safely and continued the journey with Grimaldi Group's Florencia. The ship was then brought from Brindisi to Messina yards for repair.2014On September 21, Europalink struck rocks off Peristeres island, north east of Corfu, Greece. All 70 crew and 692 passengers were evacuated. It was later refloated and taken in to Kerkyra, Greece for repairs. Europalink was on a voyage from Patras, Greece to Ancona.2017Starting with January the Adriatic line again called at the ferry port of Venice twice weekly, arriving and departing during the night hours.2018Europa Palace, which was chartered to Tirrenia di Navigazione as Amsicora, returns to Minoan Lines as Mykonos Palace on the Piraeus-Chania line.
Minoan Lines also acquires Santorini Palace, previously operated as Highspeed 7 by Hellenic Seaways, and starts serving the Heraklion-Santorini-Ios-Par
os-Mykonos route.2020'Minoan Lines puts to her ships scrubbers Knossos Palace, Festos Palace, Mykonos Palace, Cruise Olympia, Cruise Europa and with that Minoan lines became the first company in Greece with scrubbersMykonos Palace replace the ships Cruise Olympia, Cruise Europa in Patras-Igoymenitsa-Ancona route because the two Cruises put scrubbers in Malta [Piombino Shipyards]
Festos Palace on February renamed Kydon Palace and sails Piraeus-Chania route
Kydon Palace on 13th of February replaced Mykonos Palace
Mykonos Palace on the 15th of February was renamed Festos Palace

2021
Cruise Europa & Cruise Olympia were returned to Grimaldi Group.
Cruise Bonaria replaced temporarily Cruise Olympia in the Line Patra-Ancona after the former's departure from the fleet.
Cruise Olbia will be transferred in late February from Grimaldi Group to Grimaldi Minoan Lines and will be renamed Europa Palace and will replace Cruise Europa in the line Patra-Ancona.
Zeus Palace was transferred in April from Grimaldi Group to Grimaldi Minoan Lines and replaced Cruise Bonaria in the line Patra-Ancona.

Fleet

Conventional ferries

Highspeed Ferries

Former Fleet

Minos (1974-1984) scrapped in 1984
Ariadne (1975-1999) scrapped as Diamond in 2010 at Aliaga, Turkey
Zakros (1977-1985) scrapped in 1985
Knossos (1978-1998) scrapped as Ancona in 2011 at Alang, India
El Greco (1979-2002) scrapped as Zaman in 2008 at Alang, India
Festos (1984-1998) scrapped as Sancack I in 2003 at Aliaga, Turkey
Agia Galini (1986-2002) sank as Dayana in 2006 at Colombia
Fedra (1987-2000) scrapped as Winner 8 in 2010 at Alang, India
King Minos  (1987-2002) scrapped as Mawadahh in 2019 at Gadani Beach, Pakistan
Daedalus (1989-2005) scrapped as Caribbean Galaxy in 2018 at Aliaga, Turkey
N.Kazantzakis (1989-2001) scrapped as Ropolis at Alang, India 2020.
Erotokritos (1991-2002) scrapped as Kritos in 2011 at Alang, India
Aretousa (1995-2002) now as Girolata for Grandi Navi Veloci since 2020
Ikarus Palace (1997-2016) now as Cruise Smeralda for GrimaldiLines since 2016
Pasiphae Palace  (1998-2009) now as Jean Nicoli for Corsica Linea since 2018
Oceanus (2001-2002) as Ariadne Palace I (2002-2003) now as Mega Express Three for Corsica Ferries since 2004 
Prometheus (2001-2004) now as Zeus Palace for Grimaldi Minoan Lines since 2021
Ariadne Palace (2002-2006) now as Moby Tommy for Moby Lines since 2006
Knossos Palace (2000-2020) now as Cruise Bonaria for Grimaldi Lines since 2020
Cruise Olympia (2010-2021) now as Cruise Sardegna for Grimaldi Lines since 2021
Cruise Europa (2009-2021) now operating for Grimaldi Lines since 2021

Routes
Crete
 Festos Palace & Knossos Palace: Piraeus - Milos - Heraklion
Cyclades
Santorini Palace: Heraklion - Santorini - Ios - Paros - Mykonos
Greece- Italy 
 Kydon Palace: Patras - Igoumenitsa - Brindisi

Affiliates

Companies that are affiliates of Minoan Lines (larger than 10%) are outlined below.

Minoan Agencies S.r.l. 95,00%
Cretan Filoxenia S.A. 99,99%
Minoan Cruises S.A. 80,28%

Former affiliates
Minoan Flying Dolphins
Forthnet

References

External links

Official Website of Minoan Lines Ferries
Minoan Lines' ships videos

Companies listed on the Athens Exchange
Ferry companies of Greece
Shipping companies of Greece
Grimaldi Group